The canton of Garonne-Lomagne-Brulhois is an administrative division of the Tarn-et-Garonne department, in southern France. It was created at the French canton reorganisation which came into effect in March 2015. Its seat is in Saint-Nicolas-de-la-Grave.

It consists of the following communes:

Asques 
Auvillar
Balignac
Bardigues
Castelmayran
Castéra-Bouzet
Caumont
Donzac
Dunes
Gensac
Gramont
Lachapelle
Lavit
Malause
Mansonville
Marsac
Maumusson
Merles
Montgaillard
Le Pin
Poupas
Puygaillard-de-Lomagne
Saint-Aignan
Saint-Cirice
Saint-Jean-du-Bouzet
Saint-Loup
Saint-Michel
Saint-Nicolas-de-la-Grave
Sistels

References

Cantons of Tarn-et-Garonne